William Kerr, 6th Marquess of Lothian,  (4 October 1763 – 27 April 1824), was a British soldier, landowner and politician. He was the son of William Kerr, 5th Marquess of Lothian. He served as a representative peer from 1817 to 1824.

Life 
Kerr was born on 4 October 1763, the son of Lord Newbattle. When he was five he was the subject of several pictures with his sister, executed by Valentine Green as mezzotints for publication.

He was educated at the University of Edinburgh. In 1786 he was elected a Fellow of the Royal Society of Edinburgh; his proposers were Dugald Stewart, James Hutton and John Robison.

He was Lord Lieutenant of Roxburghshire from 1812 and of Midlothian from 1819. He served as Colonel of the Edinburgh Militia from 25 March 1811 until his death.

He was created a Knight of the Thistle in 1820 and Baron of Kersheugh in 1821.

He lived in the family home of Monteviot House near Jedburgh.

Kerr died in Richmond, Surrey, on 27 April 1824.

Family

He married, firstly, Lady Harriet Hobart, a younger daughter of John Hobart, 2nd Earl of Buckinghamshire (and the divorced wife of Armar Lowry-Corry, 1st Earl Belmore), on 14 April 1793. They had four children:

John Kerr, 7th Marquess of Lothian (1794–1841)
Lord Schomberg Robert (1795–1825), soldier, died unmarried.
Lady Isabella Emily Caroline (1797–1858), died unmarried.
Lord Henry Francis Charles (1800–1882), religious minister, married Louisa Hope, a daughter of Sir Alexander Hope.

His first wife died in 1805 and on 1 December 1806, at Dalkeith House, he married Lady Harriet Scott, a younger daughter of Henry Scott, 3rd Duke of Buccleuch. They had eight children:

Lady Elizabeth Georgiana Kerr (1807–1871), married Charles Trefusis, 19th Baron Clinton.
Lady Harriet Louise Anne (1808–1884), married Sir John Stuart Hepburn Forbes, 8th Baronet.
Lady Frances (1810–1863), married George Wade.
Lady Anne Katherine (1812–1829), died unmarried.
Lord Charles Lennox (1814–1898), soldier, married Charlotte Hanmer, a daughter of Sir Thomas Hanmer, 2nd Baronet.
Lord Mark Ralph George (1817–1900), soldier, died unmarried.
Lord Frederick Herbert (1818–1896), admiral, married Emily Maitland, a daughter of Sir Peregrine Maitland.
Lady Georgiana Augusta (1821–1859), married Rev. Granville Forbes.

References

1763 births
1824 deaths
Alumni of the University of Edinburgh
Fellows of the Royal Society of Edinburgh
Knights of the Thistle
Lord-Lieutenants of Midlothian
Lord-Lieutenants of Roxburghshire
Edinburgh Militia officers
Scottish representative peers
Marquesses of Lothian
Peers of the United Kingdom created by George IV